Matti Vanhanen's first cabinet was the 69th government of Finland. The cabinet was in office from 24 July 2003 to 19 April 2007, and its prime minister was Matti Vanhanen. The government was composed of a coalition formed by the Centre Party, the Social Democratic Party, and the Swedish People's Party.

Ministers 

|}

References 

Vanhanen, 1
2003 establishments in Finland
2007 disestablishments in Finland
Cabinets established in 2003
Cabinets disestablished in 2007